2006 Sunfeast Open was the second edition of the WTA tennis tournament held in Kolkata, West Bengal, India from 18 to 24 September 2006 for women's professional tennis. It was a Tier III event with the prize money of US$175,000.

Finals

Singles

 Martina Hingis defeated  Olga Puchkova 6–0, 6–4
 It was Hingis' 2nd title of the year and 42nd of her career

Doubles

 Liezel Huber /  Sania Mirza defeated   Yuliya Beygelzimer /  Yuliana Fedak, 6–4, 6–0
 It was Huber's 3rd title of the year and 15th of her career
 It was Mirza's 1st title of the year and 2nd of her career

Entrants

Seeds

 Rankings as of 11 September 2006.

Other entrants
The following players received wildcards into the singles main draw:
  Ankita Bhambri
  Sunitha Rao
  Shikha Uberoi

The following players received entry from the qualifying draw:
  Sanaa Bhambri
  Rushmi Chakravarthi
  Chuang Chia-jung
  Iroda Tulyaganova

References

Sunfeast Open
Sunfeast Open
Sunfeast Open